The Srepok River is a major tributary of the Mekong River. It runs from Đắk Lắk Province in the Central Highlands of Vietnam through the Ratanakiri and Stung Treng provinces in Cambodia to join the Mekong near Stung Treng town. Its length varies from 406 km to 450 km in which the last 281 km course is in Cambodian territory. The Srepok River, in turn, has three main tributaries: the Krông Nô, Krông Ana, and Ea H'leo Rivers. Before joining the Mekong, the Srepok also merges with the Sesan River and Kong River in Stung Treng province. In Vietnam, it is also called Dak Krong river.

Course
Forming from two tributaries—Krông Nô and Krông Ana rivers in the western side of the South Annamite Mountain Range in Vietnam's Central Highlands province of Đắk Lắk—the Srepok runs through Krông Ana, Buôn Đôn, and Ea Súp districts to the west. Just entering the territory of Cambodia, the Srepok is joined by the Ea H'leo River. In Cambodia, it runs through the Ratanakiri and Stung Treng provinces. In Stung Treng, before entering the Mekong, it is joined first by the Se San River and then by the Se Kong River.

The river's course from the confluence of Krông Nô and Krông Ana rivers to the Vietnam–Cambodia border is approximately 126 km. From the border to Stung Treng is about 281 km.

Usage

At the late nineteenth century when road infrastructure was underdeveloped, Srepok river was a crucial water transport route between Vietnam's Central Highlands and Cambodia and Laos. Lao people and Khmer people went to the upstream by boats to exercise trading with people there. Ban Don (Buôn Đôn, Đắk Lắk, Vietnam) once was a busy river port town. Lao people came and inhabited in Stung Treng as well as Ban Don and considerably contributed to Ban Don's special culture features. 

Historically, the river was a natural divider between Western and South-Central Bahnaric-speaking people.  

Rivers of Đắk Lắk province
Rivers of Cambodia
International rivers of Asia
Tributaries of the Mekong River
Rivers of Vietnam